Alberto Migré, pseudonym of "Felipe Alberto Milletari Miagro" (12 September 1931, Buenos Aires – 10 March 2006) was an Argentine TV screenwriter and producer, specialized on telenovelas.

Family background
Alberto was born in the barrio of Almagro, Buenos Aires, under the name of Felipe Alberto Milletari Miagro; the son of Piedmontese immigrants, his father Don Milletari was arriving from Italy when he met the daughter of another piemontes family the Miagro, whom were living in the Córdoba Province of Argentina after arriving from Italy via Brazil.

His upbringing was enriched by the entrepreneurial spirit of his father and the intellectual influence of her mother a dedicated reader of history and philosophy. By the time he entered the professional world of writers and TV production industry, Alberto was advised by his colleagues and mentors to change his name, a common dynamic in the industry, as such after consulting and researching names he decided to create a combination name based on his second name Albereto and a variation of his mother's surname Miagro in  Judæo-Piedmontese language, and his pseudonym "Alberto Migré" was born; giving him the seal to a successful career.

TV career
Migré started off working in radio stations, with the idea of eventually becoming an actor, although he himself acknowledged that his voice was not good for the microphone. He wrote some scripts for a children's programme and ended up in charge of sound in a radionovela starring Chela Ruiz and Horacio Delfino. He was commended by Ruiz and put in charge of writing some major programmes, such as Revista juvenil argentina (1948). Then he moved on to television.

Starting in 1972, Migré created major hits, such as Rolando Rivas, taxista, Piel Naranja and Pobre diabla. He also contributed with some Brazilian series. In 1974 he wrote the script for the cinema version of Rolando Rivas, taxista.

During the 1990s Migré was practically forgotten by the TV industry. Migré often criticized the new ways of writing TV fiction, especially the over-long series of episodes driven by good ratings and other economical factors alone: "In the 60s, telenovelas lasted 22 half-hour episodes; it was a delight, you had a plan, developed the story with a rhythm and precise guidelines and then you went on to think of another story." He was also a vindicator of the role of the creative screenwriter: "Current TV is not for me, since it is not what I was taught: I learned that the author was the foundation upon which the whole project was built. Now the author has lost importance and has been replaced by a team of writers in charge of a coordinator."

Migré never married, and lived with his parents until their death. He died while sleeping, victim of a heart attack, at the age of 75. He was the incumbent president of Argentores, the Argentine scriptwriter's guild. By an explicit request made in advance, he did not have a funeral service.

Filmography

Television work

 Piel Naranja...años después (2004) actors: Arnaldo André and Leonor Benedetto.
 Pobre diabla (2000) actors: Angie Cepeda, Salvador del Solar and Arnaldo André 
 Louca Paixão (1999)
 El Rafa (1997)
 Alguna vez tendremos alas (1997)
 Antônio Alves, Taxista (1996)
 Son cosas de novela (1996) (writer and producer)
 Leandro Leiva, un soñador (1995) actors: Miguel Ángel Solá, China Zorrilla and Carlos Estrada
 Inconquistable corazón (1994) co-author Victor Agú. acting: Paola Krum and Pablo Rago.
 Esos que dicen amarse (1993) main actors: Carolina Papaleo, Raúl Taibo
 Fiesta y bronca de ser joven (1992) acting Laura Novoa
 Pobre diabla (1972) with Soledad Silveyra, second production in (1990) main actors: Jeannette Rodriguez, Osvaldo Laport
 Una voz en el teléfono (1990) main actors: Carolina Papaleo, Raúl Taibo 
 No va más... la vida nos separa (1988) (writer and producer) acting: Nora Carpena, Juan Carlos Dual
 Sin marido (1988) acting: Patricia Palmer, Gustavo Garzón
 Ella contra mí (1988) acting: Gustavo Garzón, Carolina Papaleo - Gustavo Garzón, Liliana Weimer 
 La cuñada (1987) acting: Maria del Carmen Valenzuela, Daniel Fanego.
 Cuando vuelvas a mí (1986) acting: Arturo Puig, Ana María Cores,  Mariana Karr
 El hombre que amo (1986) acting: Germán Krauss, Silvia Kutika, Stella Maris Closas
 Amor prohibido (1986) versión libre de Maestro & Vainmann. acting: Verónica Castro, Jean Carlos Simancas.
 Tal como somos (1984) (escritor y productor)
 Sola (1983) acting: Zulma Faiad, Francisco Llanos.
 Un hombre como vos (1982) acting: Claudio Garcia Satur.
 Celos (1982) Chilean version of "Piel Naranja"
 Chau, amor mío (1979) acting: Soledad Silveyra, Arnaldo André
 Vos y yo, toda la vida (1978) acting: Maria del Carmen Valenzuela, Arturo Puig
 El tema es el amor (1977) (writer and producer)
 Pablo en nuestra piel (1977) acting: Maria del Carmen Valenzuela, Arturo Puig
 Los que estamos solos (1976) acting: Nora Cárpena, Arnaldo André
 Dos a quererse (1976) acting: Thelma Biral, Claudio Garcia Satur
 Piel naranja (1975) acting: Arnaldo André, Marilina Ross, China Zorrilla
 Mi hombre sin noche (1974) acting: Soledad Silveyra, Arnaldo André
 Pobre diabla (1972) acting: Soledad Silveyra, Arnaldo André, China Zorrilla
 Rolando Rivas, taxista (1972) acting: Claudio García Satur, Soledad Silveyra - Claudio García Satur, Nora Cárpena
 Un extraño en nuestras vidas (1972) (writer and producer)
 Nacido para odiarte (1971) acting: Silvina Rada
 El adorable profesor Aldao (1971) acting: Alberto Martin, Beatriz Taibo
 Mis tres amores (1971)
 Esta noche... miedo (1970)
 Inconquistable Viviana Ortiguera (1970)
 El hombre que me negaron (1970) (writer and producer)
 Trampa para un play boy (1969) (writer and producer)
 Cuando vuelvas a mí (1969) (writer and producer)
 Adorable profesor Aldao (1968) (writer and producer)
 La pulpera de Santa Lucía (1968)
 Mujeres en presidio (1967) (writer and producer)
 Lo mejor de nuestra vida... nuestros hijos (1967) (writer and producer) 
 Su comedia favorita (1965) (writer and producer) 
 O Pintor e a Florista (1964)
 É Proibido Amar (1964)
 El hogar que nos negamos (1964)
 Acacia Montero (1964) (writer and producer)
 Tu triste mentira de amor (1964)
 2-5499 Ocupado (1963)
 Dos a quererse (1963)
 Altanera Evangelina Garret (1962)
 Silvia muere mañana (1962)
 Amelia no vendrá (1962)
 Aquí a las seis (1962)
 El 0597 está ocupado (1956)
 0597 da ocupado (1950)

Cine 
 Rolando Rivas, taxista (1974) (writer and producer)
 Ese que siempre esta solo (1964) (writer and producer)

References
  La Nación, 11 March 2006. Murió Alberto Migré.
  La Capital, 11 March 2006. Alberto Migré elevó a la telenovela al rango de clásico de la cultura pop.

1931 births
2006 deaths
Argentine male writers
Argentine people of Italian descent
People from Buenos Aires
Burials at La Chacarita Cemetery